Cleveland Air Route Traffic Control Center (ZOB) or Cleveland Center is located at 326 East Lorain Street, Oberlin, Ohio, United States. The center is located about  outside of the city of Cleveland. The Cleveland ARTCC is the 3rd busiest of the 22 Air Route Traffic Control Centers in the United States. It oversees the airspace over portions of Maryland, Michigan, New York, Ohio, Pennsylvania, West Virginia, as well as the southernmost portion of Ontario, Canada.

The Air Route Traffic Control Center was first planned in 1958. The site was chosen due to Oberlin's location near Cleveland, though far enough away from the metropolis to be safe in case of war. The nearby community of Medina, Ohio was also under consideration, but lobbying by the Oberlin city government brought the center to its present location.

During the September 11 attacks, the Cleveland ARTCC handled the radio traffic from United Airlines Flight 93, which was inside the center's airspace from before the hijacking to the time of its crash.

References

External links
Cleveland Center Weather Service Unit (CWSU) (NWS/FAA)
Frequencies for Cleveland Center

Air traffic control centers
Transportation buildings and structures in Cleveland
WAAS reference stations
Buildings and structures in Lorain County, Ohio
Air traffic control in the United States
Aviation in Ohio